Baldrine is a village in the Isle of Man. It is close to the east coast of the island, about 3 km south of Laxey and 6 km NE of Douglas. It is in the historic parish of Lonan, in the sheading of Garff. For administrative purposes it is in the parish district of Garff, and it is also in the House of Keys constituency of Garff.

Geography
Baldrine is located on the A2 road, the coast road between Douglas and Ramsey and the area includes three halts (or stations) on the Manx Electric Railway: Baldrine, Sunnycott and Garwick Glen. The River Gawne flows through the village and then through Garwick Glen down towards Garwick Beach at Garwick Bay (part of Laxey Bay).

Also within the bounds of Baldrine is Ballannette Country Park, a nature reserve which includes a group of lakes and bird watching locations. The country park is a registered Dark Sky Park, where light pollution is restricted.

History
The name of the village dates back to at least 1643 and comes from the Manx words Bailey drine, which translates to "farm of the blackthorn".

It has had two Primitive Methodist chapels, the first was built in 1843, under the direction of Anne Kelly, a resident of Barroose. Her husband, Thomas Kelly, sold  of land for the chapel for 2 shillings. Anne Kelly laid the first stone, and prayed upon it for the head of the church to bless the building. The building would cost £100 to erect.

The second chapel was built in 1883 when the first started to exceed its capacity, at the cost of £383. The new chapel could seat 118, and included a Sunday school for the local children.

In 1850, the Liverpool Arms public house was opened in the village. The pub was shut in 2017, and the brewery that owned it put it up for sale, on the understanding that it would not longer be a pub. However,  the local council did not allow the change of use, stating that the building should remain a pub.

In 2018 Laxey Bay was designated as a Marine Nature Reserve.

References

Isle of Man
Villages in the Isle of Man